Jeffrey H. Winicour is an American physicist and professor at the University of Pittsburgh, who specialized in the theory of relativity.  Winicour's 1964 PhD dissertation was an "investigation of the gravitational coupling of radiation fields in the framework of the general theory of relativity." Winicour was the advisor to Luis Lehner, who received the 1999 Nicholas Metropolis Award from the American Physical Society. The award credited Lehner and Winicour, as advisor, for "developing a method that significantly advances the capability for modeling gravitational radiation by making possible the stable numerical solution of Einstein's equation near moving black holes."

His most cited papers are

 Janis AI, Newman ET, Winicour J. Reality of the Schwarzschild singularity. Physical Review Letters. 1968 Apr 15;20(16):878. Cited 444 times according to Google Scholar
 LA Tamburino LA, Winicour JH. Gravitational fields in finite and conformal Bondi frames. Physical Review. 1966 Oct 28;150(4):1039. Cited 255 times according to Google Scholar  *	
Winicour J. Characteristic evolution and matching. Living reviews in relativity. 2012 Dec;15(1):1-99. Cited 38 times according to Google Scholar 
Bishop NT, Gómez R, Lehner L, Maharaj M, Winicour J. High-powered gravitational news. Physical Review D. 1997 Nov 15;56(10):6298. Cited 160 times according to Google Scholar

References

Year of birth missing (living people)
Living people
American physicists